David Brian Pfaff (born 26 June 1966) is a South African businessman and former first-class cricketer.

Pfaff was born at Cape Town in June 1966. He later studied at the University of Cape Town, before studying in England at Keble College at the University of Oxford. While studying at Oxford, Pfaff played first-class cricket for Oxford University in 1991, making eight appearances. Pfaff scored 231 runs in his eight matches at an average of 46.20, with a high score of 50. 

After graduating from Oxford he went into business. Pfaff is currently the chief operating officer and chief financial officer of Truworths. His father, Brian, and brother, Michael, both played first-class cricket.

References

External links

1965 births
Living people
People from Cape Town
University of Cape Town alumni
Alumni of Keble College, Oxford
South African cricketers
Oxford University cricketers
South African businesspeople
Alumni of Hilton College (South Africa)